The 2021 AFL draft consisted of the various periods where the 18 clubs in the Australian Football League (AFL) can trade and recruit players during and following the completion of the 2021 AFL season.

The National Draft returned to being a two day event in 2021, after being held on a single night in 2020.

After coming 18th in the 2021 AFL season, the North Melbourne Football Club held the number one draft pick in the National draft for the first time, selecting  midfielder Jason Horne-Francis.

Key Dates

2021 mid-season rookie draft 
The mid-season draft was held after the conclusion of Round 11 of the 2021 AFL season on 2 June. The draft was only open to clubs with inactive players on their list and vacancies available, such as long term injuries or retirements.

Previous trades 
Since 2015, clubs have been able to trade future picks in the next year's national draft during the trade period. As a result, a total of 30 selections for the 2021 draft were traded during the 2020 trade period. Further trades of future picks can be made before or during the 2020 national draft. The selection order for each of these picks is tied to the original club's finishing position in the 2021 season.

Player movements

Free agency 

  Tyson Stengle was delisted by  during the 2021 pre-season

Trades

List changes

Retirements

Delistings

2021 national draft

Rookie elevations 
Clubs were able to promote any player who was listed on their rookie list in 2021 to their 2022 primary playing list prior to the draft.

2022 pre-season draft

2022 rookie draft

Category B rookie selections

Pre-season supplemental selection period

See also 
 2021 AFL Women's draft

References 

Australian Football League draft
Draft
AFL Draft
2020s in Melbourne
Australian rules football in Victoria (Australia)
Sport in Melbourne
Events in Melbourne